João Clemente Baena Soares (born 14 May 1931) is a Brazilian diplomat.

Soares was born in Belém. He worked at the Brazilian Ministry of External Relations for 31 years before being elected to serve as Secretary General of the Organization of American States from 1984 to 1994.

In Brazil, he has also served as Secretary General of Foreign Affairs of Brazil (that is, as Brazil's Vice-Chancellor).

Between 1997 and 2006, he was a member of the United Nations International Law Commission. On 4 November 2003 UN Secretary-General Kofi Annan appointed him to sit on the High Level Threat Panel.

On September 1, 2006, he was appointed to the United Nations Human Rights Council's High-Level Commission of Inquiry charged with probing allegations that Israel systematically targeted and killed Lebanese civilians during the 2006 Lebanon War.

Publications 
 Sem medo da diplomácia (2006)

References

External links

1931 births
Living people
Brazilian diplomats
Brazilian jurists
People from Belém
Secretaries General of the Organization of American States
Pontifical Catholic University of Rio de Janeiro alumni
Members of the International Law Commission